Way Kanan Regency is a regency (kabupaten) of Lampung Province, Sumatra, Indonesia. It has an area of 3,921.63 km2 and had a population of 406,735 at the 2010 census and 493,575 at the 2020 census. The administrative centre lies at the town of Blambangan Umpu.

Administrative districts
The regency is divided into fourteen districts (kecamatan), listed below with their areas and their populations at the 2010 census and the 2020 census.

References

Regencies of Lampung